Axon Enterprise, Inc. v. Federal Trade Commission (Docket 21–86) is a pending United States Supreme Court case related to administrative law.

Background

Axon Enterprise v. FTC 

Axon Enterprise manufactures Tasers and police-worn body cameras. In May 2018, Axon purchased its competitor in the body camera market, Vievu LLC, for $13 million. The Federal Trade Commission soon began an antitrust investigation into Axon. The company offered to settle, but the FTC declined. In January 2020, Axon filed a lawsuit in the United States District Court for the District of Arizona, challenging the constitutionality of the FTC's structure. The district court dismissed the case, holding that federal law stripped it of jurisdiction to consider constitutional claims against the FTC while proceedings were underway. The United States Court of Appeals for the Ninth Circuit affirmed in a 2–1 vote. Judge Patrick J. Bumatay dissented. Axon Enterprise then filed a petition for a writ of certiorari with the Supreme Court in July 2021, which was subsequently granted in January 2022.

SEC v. Cochran 

The Securities and Exchange Commission brought an enforcement against Michelle Cochran, a certified public accountant, in April 2016 for failure to comply with the auditing standards of the Public Company Accounting Oversight Board. After a hearing before the SEC's internal administrative law judges, the SEC imposed a fine and banned her from practicing before the SEC. While the case was still pending, the Supreme Court entered its ruling in Lucia v. SEC which held the SEC's ALJs must be appointed in accordance with the Appointments Clause. In response, the SEC reassigned Cochran's case to a new ALJ. In January 2018, Cochran filed a lawsuit in the United States District Court for the Northern District of Texas, challenging the constitutionality of the SEC's structure. The district court dismissed the case, holding federal law stripped it of jurisdiction to consider constitutional claims against the SEC while proceedings were underway. The United States Court of Appeals for the Fifth Circuit affirmed in 2-1 vote. In a divided opinion, the Fifth Circuit sitting en banc reversed the decision, holding the district court had jurisdiction to hear the claim. The SEC then filed a petition for a writ of certiorari with the Supreme Court in March 2022, which was subsequently granted in May 2022.

Arguments
The question argued by the sides was whether the language of the FTC Act (and Exchange Act) precludes district court jurisdiction over Axon and Cochron's claims. And whether even if it does, Axon and Cochron’s claims fall outside the acts’ statutory schemes of jurisdiction, and therefore are subject to district court jurisdiction regardless. 

In discerning whether a claim falls outside a statute’s review provision, the court in Thunder Basin Coal v. Reich set forth a three-factor test; courts must survey whether the claim enjoys meaningful review under the statute,  whether the claim is ‘wholly collateral’ to the review scheme, and whether the claim is outside the agency’s expertise. The arguments presented in the briefs and oral arguments mostly pertained to the language of the acts and the bearing of the Thunder Basin factors on the claims at hand.

The government argued that the detailed and comprehensive character of the FTC and Exchange Acts’ review schemes, instructs the courts that jurisdiction provided in those schemes is exclusive.  Those schemes provide jurisdiction to appellate courts over final agency orders (Cease and desist order in the FTC Act), and so the government contended - the exhaustivity of the schemes implicitly precludes district courts jurisdiction, and any jurisdiction over matters mid-proceeding. The government cited the APA as concurrently stating that only final agency action is reviewable by courts. Axon and Chorcon argued that the FTC and Exchange Acts can't be construed as limiting jurisdiction, because the district courts were granted original jurisdiction over constitutional claims; jurisdiction traditionally left intact unless expressly stripped away. Axon resisted the government's inference, stressing that the FTC and Exchange Acts only ever expressly grant jurisdiction and never expressly limit it. As to the APA, Axon and Cochron argued that the act only applies when the administrative regime provides adequate relief which it doesn’t for the claims at hand. 

Axon and Corchon further argued that Thunder Basin works in their favor. First they contested that the acts’ review schemes don’t afford any avenue for a meaningful review of their claims. An appeal after culmination of agency action offers no remedy for their ‘here-and-now’ injury of being subjected to an unconstitutional process. Next they argued that their claims are ‘wholly collateral’ to the review schemes, as their claims are aimed at the very existence and structure of the agencies. And third they argued that the agencies don’t have the expertise needed to review their claims, no level of qualification in antitrust administrative law is of use in deciding constitutional questions. What is more, no agency has the authority to declare itself unconstitutional, all the more so in this case where the provision in question isn’t even a part of the FTC Act.

The government in turn disputed Axon and Chorcon’s analysis of the Thunder Basin factors. With regards to the first factor, the government stressed that all parts of an agency’s proceeding are reviewable in an appellate court. Answering Axon’s ‘here-and-now’ injury claim, the government cited the FTC v. Standard Oil holding that “[m]ere litigation expense, even substantial and unrecoupable cost, does not constitute irreparable injury.” Next the government attacked the purported collateralness, pressing that Axon’s claims did not arise ‘outside’ the administrative enforcement scheme but as an integral part of it; real ‘collateral’ claims are claims such as immunity, which attack the legitimacy of the proceedings’ commencement itself. As for the lack of expertise claims, the government contended that constitutional review may be avoided altogether if the reviewee wins in the agency level, therefore premature review in the district court is ill-advised as a matter of constitutional avoidance. The government gave further premonition: allowing for mid-proceeding appeals “would also burden reviewing courts, requiring them to engage in piecemeal review and to decide issues whose resolution might prove to have been unnecessary upon completion of the agency proceeding.”

The case’s similarity to previous supreme court precedent prompted much comparing and contrasting by both sides, especially with regards to Free Enterprise Fund. Axon and Chorcon described Free Enterprise Fund as nearly analogous to this case, in that both involve claims “go[ing] to the very existence of the agency… wholly collateral to the merits of any acquisition… beyond the competence of the agency. And [that in both] the agency is not in a position to provide meaningful relief.” The government however emphasized that in Free Enterprise the constitutional objections were directed at the PCAOB investigations not the agency, and were granted review by district courts precisely because they weren’t agency proceedings reviewable under the review position. Moreover, much weight was given in Free Enterprise to the fact that petitioners would need to incur penalty upon themselves in order to enter appealable agency proceedings, here on the other hand, Axon and Chorcon were already subject to agency proceedings.

Supreme Court 
On June 1, 2022, the Court consolidated the case with Securities and Exchange Commission v. Cochran (Docket No. 21-1239) as both cases address substantially the same questions.

References 

2023 in United States case law
United States Supreme Court cases
United States Supreme Court cases of the Roberts Court